Fearless is the third studio album by Mexican progressive metal and Latin metal band Acrania, released on April 25, 2015 with the support of Mexico's Council for Culture and Arts. The album is the first to feature guitarist César Cortés, who replaced Félix Carreón in 2013. A music playthrough video was released for the album's first single "People of the Blaze" on April 22, 2015. A second music video for the song "I Was Never Dead" was released on August 21, 2017.

Track listing

Personnel 
Acrania

 Luis Oropeza – Vocals, Guitars
 Johnny Chavez – Drums
 César Cortés – Guitars
 Alberto Morales – Bass

Additional musicians

 Ignacio Gómez – Percussion
 Daniel Pérez – Sax
 Said Cuevas – Trumpet
 Adriana Cao - Arpa Jarocha

Production and design

 Johnny Chavez – production, engineering, mixing
 Acrania – production, music arrangement
 Brett Caldas-Lima - Mastering
 Eliran Kantor – artwork
 Germán García – photography

References 

Acrania (band) albums
2015 albums